Sir John Danvers (1540 – 19 December 1594) of Dauntsey, Wiltshire and Cirencester, Gloucestershire, was an English politician.

He was the eldest son of Sylvester Danvers of Dauntsey, Wiltshire. He married Elizabeth, the daughter and coheiress of John Nevill, 4th Lord Latimer, through which he obtained Danby Castle and large estates in Yorkshire. He was knighted in 1574.

He served as a Justice of the Peace (JP) for Wiltshire from around 1573 and High Sheriff of Wiltshire for 1574–75, 1585–86 and 1593. He was also a JP for Gloucestershire from around 1583 and High Sheriff of Gloucestershire for 1593–94. He was a member of the Council in the Marches of Wales from 1594.

He was a Member (MP) of the Parliament of England for Wiltshire in 1571 and for Malmesbury in 1572.

He died in 1594, leaving three sons and six daughters. His eldest son Charles was executed for treason in 1601. His second son Henry was created Earl of Danby. His youngest son John was a signatory of Charles I's death warrant.

References

1540 births
1594 deaths
People from Cirencester
People from Wiltshire
English MPs 1571
English MPs 1572–1583
High Sheriffs of Wiltshire
High Sheriffs of Gloucestershire